Vladyslav Romanovych Prylyopa (born 2 March 2000) is a Ukrainian professional footballer who plays as a centre-forward for Ukrainian club Podillya Khmelnytskyi.

References

External links
 Profile on Podillya Khmelnytskyi official website
 
 

2000 births
Living people
People from Dnipropetrovsk Oblast
Ukrainian footballers
Association football forwards
FC Chornomorets Odesa players
FC Chornomorets-2 Odesa players
FC Podillya Khmelnytskyi players
Ukrainian First League players
Ukrainian Second League players
Sportspeople from Dnipropetrovsk Oblast